Mother o' Mine may refer to:
 Mother o' Mine (1921 film), an American silent drama film
 Mother O' Mine (1917 film), an American silent drama film

See also
 Mother of Mine (disambiguation)